Fezile Dabi District Municipality, formerly known as Northern Free State District Municipality, is one of the 5 districts of Free State province of South Africa. The seat of Northern Free State is Sasolburg. The majority of its 460 289 people speak Sesotho (2001 Census). The district code is DC20.

Geography

Neighbours
Northern Free State is surrounded by:
 Sedibeng in Gauteng to the north (DC42)
 Gert Sibande in Mpumalanga to the north-east (DC30)
 Thabo Mofutsanyane to the south-east (DC19)
 Lejweleputswa to the south-west (DC18)
 Dr Kenneth Kaunda in North-West to the north-west (DC40)

Local municipalities
The district contains the following local municipalities:

Demographics
The following statistics are from the 2001 census.

Sex

Ethnic group

Age

Politics

Election results
Election results for Northern Free State in the South African general election, 2004. 
 Population 18 and over: 293 994 [63.87% of total population]
 Total votes: 182 833 [39.72% of total population]
 Voting % estimate: 62.19% votes as a % of population 18 and over

References

External links
 Official Website

District municipalities of the Free State (province)
Fezile Dabi District Municipality